Lindsay Goldman (née Bayer; born October 31, 1984) is an American professional racing cyclist, who currently rides for and co-owns UCI Women's Team .

See also
 List of 2015 UCI Women's Teams and riders

References

External links
 

1984 births
Living people
American female cyclists
Place of birth missing (living people)
21st-century American women